Brinsley Butler, 1st Viscount Lanesborough (1670–6 March 1735) was an Irish politician and peer.

Butler was the son of Francis Butler and Judith Jones. He represented Kells in the Irish House of Commons between 1703 and 1713, before sitting for Belturbet from 1713 to 1724. Upon the death of his brother Theophilus Butler on 11 March 1724 he succeeded to his peerage and assumed his seat in the Irish House of Lords. In 1726 was made a member of the Privy Council of Ireland. In 1728 he was created Viscount Lanesborough in the Peerage of Ireland.

He married Catharine Pooley, with whom he had twenty-three children, although only five survived infancy. He was succeeded in his titles by his son, Humphrey Butler, who was made Earl of Lanesborough in 1756.

References

1670 births
1725 deaths
Butler, Brinsley
Butler, Brinsley
Butler, Brinsley
Members of the Irish House of Lords
Members of the Parliament of Ireland (pre-1801) for County Cavan constituencies
Members of the Parliament of Ireland (pre-1801) for County Meath constituencies
Members of the Privy Council of Ireland
Viscounts in the Peerage of Ireland